James Chiun-Yue Ho (born February 27, 1973) is a Taiwanese-born American attorney and jurist. He was nominated to serve as a U.S. circuit judge of the U.S. Court of Appeals for the Fifth Circuit by President Donald Trump, and took office in 2018. Ho formerly served as Solicitor General of Texas from 2008 to 2010.

Early life and education 
Ho was born in 1973 in Taipei, Taiwan. He moved to the United States with his parents as a toddler and was raised in San Marino, California.

After graduating from the Polytechnic School in Pasadena, Ho studied public policy at Stanford University, graduating in 1995 with a Bachelor of Arts with honors. After spending one year at California State University, Sacramento as a California Senate Fellow, Ho attended the University of Chicago Law School, where he was an editor of the University of Chicago Law Review. He graduated in 1999 with a Juris Doctor degree with high honors and Order of the Coif membership.

Career 
After graduating from law school, Ho was a law clerk to Judge Jerry Edwin Smith of the United States Court of Appeals for the Fifth Circuit from 1999 to 2000 and Justice Clarence Thomas of the Supreme Court of the United States, from 2000 to 2001. He was in private practice in Washington, D.C., at the law firm Gibson Dunn from 2001 to 2002. 

He then joined the U.S. Department of Justice, first in the Civil Rights Division (2001) and then in the Office of Legal Counsel (2001–2003).  During his time at the Office of Legal Counsel, Ho authored a memo that defended the legality of torture, then referred to as enhanced interrogation techniques. He was chief counsel to subcommittees of the Senate Judiciary Committee from 2003 to 2005 under Republican Senator John Cornyn. He was then a law clerk to United States Supreme Court Justice Clarence Thomas from 2005 to 2006. 

Ho was in private practice in Dallas, Texas from 2006 to 2008 and 2010 to 2017. From 2008 to 2010, he was Solicitor General of Texas in the Office of the Attorney General of Texas, replacing Ted Cruz in that position. As Texas solicitor general, Ho led the state's lawsuits against the Obama administration.

Ho has worked as a volunteer attorney with the First Liberty Institute, a religious legal advocacy organization. He has held multiple positions as a member of the Federalist Society since 1996.

In a 2006 law review article published in The Green Bag, Ho wrote that "Birthright citizenship is guaranteed by the Fourteenth Amendment. That birthright is protected no less for children of undocumented persons than for descendants of Mayflower passengers." In a 2011 op-ed published in the Wall Street Journal, Ho wrote that "Opponents of illegal immigration cannot claim to champion the rule of law and then, in the same breath, propose policies that violate our Constitution."

Federal judicial service 
On September 28, 2017, President Donald Trump announced his intent to nominate Ho as a Circuit Judge to an undetermined seat on the United States Court of Appeals for the Fifth Circuit. Cruz had promoted Ho as a candidate for a vacancy on the court. On October 16, 2017, Trump sent Ho's nomination to the Senate. He was nominated to the seat vacated by Judge Carolyn Dineen King, who assumed senior status on December 31, 2013. On November 15, 2017, a hearing on his nomination was held before the Senate Judiciary Committee. On December 7, 2017, his nomination was reported out of committee by a 11–9 vote. On December 13, 2017, the United States Senate invoked cloture on his nomination by a 53–44 vote. On December 14, 2017, Ho’s nomination was confirmed by a 53–43 vote. He received his judicial commission on January 4, 2018.

In July 2018, Carrie Johnson of NPR wrote that "Ho has shaken up the staid world of appellate law by deploying aggressive rhetoric in cases involving guns, abortion rights and campaign finance regulations." Johnson wrote that "critics say Ho is writing op-ed columns, not legal opinions... Friends and former colleagues said he's an intellectual engaging with ideas." In a judicial opinion, Ho said the current "government... would be unrecognizable to our Founders"; in another he wrote of the First Amendment "right[s] of... bishops to express their profound objection to the moral tragedy of abortion".

On September 9, 2020, Trump included Ho on a list of potential nominees to the Supreme Court.

On September 29, 2022, Ho delivered a speech at a Federalist Society conference in Kentucky and said he would no longer hire law clerks from Yale Law School, which he said was plagued by "cancel culture" and students disrupting conservative speakers. Ho said Yale "not only tolerates the cancellation of views — it actively practices it.", and he urged other judges to likewise boycott the school. U.S. Circuit Judge Elizabeth L. Branch of the United States Court of Appeals for the Eleventh Circuit confirmed her participation in the Yale boycott in a statement to National Review. Branch told the National Review that Ho raised "legitimate concerns about the lack of free speech on law school campuses, Yale in particular," and that she would not consider students from Yale for clerkships in the future.

Notable opinions 
On April 18, 2018, in his first written opinion as a Fifth Circuit judge, Ho dissented from a denial of a rehearing en banc in a case regarding a limit on campaign contributions. The Fifth Circuit three-judge panel upheld the constitutionality of a City of Austin ordinance setting an individual campaign contribution limit of $350 per election for candidates for mayor and city council, rejecting the plaintiff's claim that the limit violated the First Amendment. In his dissent, Ho argued the court "should have granted rehearing en banc and held that the Austin contribution limit violates the First Amendment" and asserted that "if there is too much money in politics, it's because there's too much government."

Ho described abortion as a "moral tragedy" in one of his rulings which upheld a Texan law that required abortion facilities to bury or cremate fetal remains.

In 2019 Ho authored a concurring opinion in the Mississippi abortion case Jackson Women's Health Organization v. Dobbs, 945 F.3d 265 (2019), criticizing the lower court for failing to respect the State's arguments in support of the Mississippi Gestational Age Act. This case later went to the Supreme Court and was the occasion for Justice Alito's 2022 opinion that declared Roe v. Wade and "Casey" overruled.
On 2020, Ho was a member of a panel that stayed a preliminary injunction entered by U.S. District Judge Fred Biery that expanded the right to use a mail-in ballot to all Texas voters during the ongoing COVID-19 pandemic (allowing broader use of mail-in voting than under the Texas Election Code, which entitled only Texas voters over age 65 to vote absentee without an excuse). Ho wrote a separate concurring opinion favoring the state officials.
In 2020, Ho wrote a concurring opinion in another voting rights case, involving a challenge to Texas Governor Greg Abbott's order restricting the number of drop-off locations for mail-in ballot to one per county. Abbott's order closed dozens of drop-off locations in populous, heavily Democratic urban areas in Texas. The order was challenged by civil rights groups, and the district court held that the order violated the constitutional right to vote. Ho joined a Fifth Circuit order that stayed the district court's ruling and held that the governor's order did not infringe the right to vote. In a concurring opinion, Ho wrote that Texas election law should not be "rewritten" by "executive fiat" or "judicial fiat." 
On April 9, 2021, Ho dissented when the 5th Circuit refused to hear en banc on a case regarding the Certification Rule used to help implement the Affordable Care Act. Ho and four other judges would have struck down the Certification Rule.
On February 22, 2023, Ho wrote a sharply worded dissent from denial of rehearing after the 5th circuit granted qualified immunity to officials who jailed their critics. Ho wrote that the 5th circuit left Americans “vulnerable to public officials who choose to weaponize criminal statutes against citizens whose political views they disfavor.”

See also 
 Donald Trump Supreme Court candidates
 List of Asian American jurists
 List of law clerks of the Supreme Court of the United States (Seat 10)

References

External links 
 
 Appearances at the U.S. Supreme Court from the Oyez Project
 James C. Ho at U.S. Courts
 

|-

1973 births
Living people
20th-century American lawyers
21st-century American lawyers
21st-century American judges
American jurists of Taiwanese descent
American politicians of Taiwanese descent
Federalist Society members
Judges of the United States Court of Appeals for the Fifth Circuit
Law clerks of the Supreme Court of the United States
People associated with Gibson Dunn
Solicitors General of Texas
Stanford University alumni
Taiwanese emigrants to the United States
Texas lawyers
Texas Republicans
United States court of appeals judges appointed by Donald Trump
United States Department of Justice lawyers
United States Senate lawyers
University of Chicago Law School alumni
People from San Marino, California
Asian conservatism in the United States